Captain Sir George Sampson Elliston MC (27 July 1875, Ipswich – 21 February 1954) was Conservative Member of Parliament (MP) for Blackburn from 1931 to 1945.

Ellison was educated at Ayerst Hall, Cambridge, Framlingham College and Pembroke College, Cambridge. He was called to the Bar from Lincoln's Inn in 1901. However, he subsequently became a doctor by profession and served with the Royal Army Medical Corps during and after the First World War.

First elected MP for Blackburn in 1931, Elliston was re-elected in 1935.

References

External links 
 

1875 births
1954 deaths
People educated at Framlingham College
Alumni of St Edmund's College, Cambridge
Alumni of Pembroke College, Cambridge
Royal Army Medical Corps officers
British Army personnel of World War I
Recipients of the Military Cross
Conservative Party (UK) MPs for English constituencies
UK MPs 1931–1935
UK MPs 1935–1945
Politics of Blackburn with Darwen
Members of Lincoln's Inn
Knights Bachelor